Harm J.G. Bouckaert was an art dealer, gallerist, and major figure in the 1980s art scene in New York City. Harm Bouckaert Gallery was located at 100 Hudson Street, between Franklin and Leonard Streets in Tribeca. Artists that exhibited at the gallery include Adrian Lee Kellard, Stewart Hitch, and Max Coyer. Notable exhibitions include a group exhibition titled "Saints" which explored the indiscrete interest in religious art carried on by young contemporary artists, and "Recent Aspects of Allover." Harm Bouckaert currently lives in the Netherlands.

Short resume 
 1934: Born June 7, 1934, Maastricht, Netherlands
 1953: Graduated N.O.I.B., predecessor of the Nyenrode Business University
 1957: Moved to New York City - start international banking career, Wall Street
 1963: Became U.S. Citizen.
 1974: Appointed by Kredietbank, Brussels, Belgium as their N.Y. representative for the U.S. and Canada
 1978: Founding N.Y. branch of the Kredietbank, currently KBC Bank.
 1981: Founded the "Harm Bouckaert Gallery" in Tribeca, NYC, contemporary American art.
 1988: Private Art Dealer - estate of Max Coyer.
 2001: Retired, currently living in Maastricht, NL

References

External links 
 New York Times
 maxcoyer.com

1934 births
Living people
American art dealers
Dutch art dealers
Nyenrode Business University alumni
People from Maastricht
Businesspeople from New York City